José Carlos Lazo Romero (born 16 February 1996) is a Spanish professional footballer who plays for RCD Espanyol as a left winger.

Club career
Born in Sanlúcar de Barrameda, Cádiz, Andalusia, Lazo joined Real Madrid's youth setup in 2002, from Atlético Sanluqueño CF. Promoted to the reserves in Segunda División B by manager Zinedine Zidane on 5 July 2015, he made his senior debut on 22 August by coming on as a second-half substitute for Enzo Zidane in a 5–1 home routing of CD Ebro. 

Lazo scored his first senior goal on 16 January 2016, netting the last in a 4–0 thrashing of CF Rayo Majadahonda. On 1 September, he was loaned to Villarreal CF for one year, and was assigned to the B-side also in the third division.

On 27 July 2017, Lazo joined fellow third tier side Recreativo de Huelva, also in a temporary deal. On 13 July of the following year, he signed a permanent contract with La Liga side Getafe CF, but was loaned to CD Lugo in Segunda División on 6 August.

Lazo made his professional debut on 26 August 2018, replacing Iriome and scoring the equalizer in a 1–1 away draw against Granada CF. The following 20 August, he joined UD Almería still in the second division, also in a temporary deal.

On 8 May 2020, Lazo agreed to a permanent four-year-contract with the Rojiblancos. He achieved promotion to the first division in 2022 as champions, and made his debut in the category at the age of 26 on 14 August 2022, replacing Largie Ramazani in a 2–1 home loss against Real Madrid.

On 24 August 2022, Lazo signed a five-year contract with RCD Espanyol in the top tier.

Honours
Almería
Segunda División: 2021–22

References

External links
Profile at the RCD Espanyol website

1996 births
Living people
People from Sanlúcar de Barrameda
Sportspeople from the Province of Cádiz
Spanish footballers
Footballers from Andalusia
Association football wingers
La Liga players
Segunda División players
Segunda División B players
Tercera División players
Real Madrid Castilla footballers
Villarreal CF B players
Recreativo de Huelva players
Getafe CF footballers
CD Lugo players
UD Almería players
RCD Espanyol footballers